Copper(I) iodide is the inorganic compound with the formula CuI.  It is also known as cuprous iodide.  It is useful in a variety of applications ranging from organic synthesis to cloud seeding.

Copper(I) iodide is white, but samples often appear tan or even, when found in nature as rare mineral marshite, reddish brown, but such color is due to the presence of impurities.  It is common for samples of iodide-containing compounds to become discolored due to the facile aerobic oxidation of the iodide anion to molecular iodine.

Structure 
Copper(I) iodide, like most binary (containing only two elements) metal halides, is an inorganic polymer.  It has a rich phase diagram, meaning that it exists in several crystalline forms. It adopts a zinc blende structure below 390 °C (γ-CuI), a wurtzite structure between 390 and 440 °C (β-CuI), and a rock salt structure above 440 °C (α-CuI).  The ions are tetrahedrally coordinated when in the zinc blende or the wurtzite structure, with a Cu-I distance of 2.338 Å.  Copper(I) bromide and copper(I) chloride also transform from the zinc blende structure to the wurtzite structure at 405 and 435 °C, respectively. Therefore, the longer the copper – halide bond length, the lower the temperature needs to be to change the structure from the zinc blende structure to the wurtzite structure. The interatomic distances in copper(I) bromide and copper(I) chloride are 2.173 and 2.051 Å, respectively. Consistent with its covalency, CuI is a p-type semiconductor.

Preparation
Copper(I) iodide can be prepared by heating iodine and copper in concentrated hydriodic acid.

In the laboratory however, copper(I) iodide is prepared by simply mixing an aqueous solution of potassium iodide and a soluble copper(II) salt such copper sulfate.
Cu2+ + 2I− → CuI  +  0.5I2

Reactions
Cuprous iodide, which degrades on standing, can be purified by dissolution into concentrated solution of potassium iodide followed by dilution.
CuI  +  I−    CuI2−
Copper(I) iodide reacts with mercury vapors to form copper tetraiodomercurate:
4CuI  +  Hg  →  Cu2HgI4  +  2Cu

This reaction can be used for the detection of mercury since the white (CuI) to brown (Cu2HgI4) color change is dramatic.

Copper(I) iodide is used in the synthesis of Cu(I) clusters. which is polymetal complex compounds.

Copper(I) iodide dissolves in acetonitrile, yielding a diverse complexes. Upon crystallization, molecular or polymeric compounds can be isolated. Dissolution is also observed when a solution of the appropriate complexing agent in acetone or chloroform is used. For example, thiourea and its derivatives can be used. Solids that crystallize out of those solutions are composed of hybrid inorganic chains.

Uses
CuI is used as a reagent in organic synthesis. In combination with 1,2- or 1,3 diamine ligands, CuI catalyzes the conversion of aryl-, heteroaryl-, and vinyl-bromides into the corresponding iodides. NaI is the typical iodide source and dioxane is a typical solvent (see aromatic Finkelstein reaction).  Aryl halides are used to form carbon–carbon and carbon–heteroatom bonds in process such as the Heck, Stille, Suzuki, Sonogashira and Ullmann type coupling reactions.  Aryl iodides, however, are more reactive than the corresponding aryl bromides or aryl chlorides. 2-Bromo-1-octen-3-ol and 1-nonyne are coupled when combined with dichlorobis(triphenylphosphine)palladium(II), CuI, and diethylamine to form 7-methylene-8-hexadecyn-6-ol.

CuI is used in cloud seeding, altering the amount or type of precipitation of a cloud, or their structure by dispersing substances into the atmosphere which increase water's ability to form droplets or crystals.  CuI provides a sphere for moisture in the cloud to condense around, causing precipitation to increase and cloud density to decrease.

The structural properties of CuI allow CuI to stabilize heat in nylon in commercial and residential carpet industries, automotive engine accessories, and other markets where durability and weight are a factor.

CuI is used as a source of dietary iodine in table salt and animal feed.

References

Further reading

External links 

Chemicalland properties database
National Pollutant Inventory – Copper and compounds fact sheet

Copper(I) compounds
Iodides
Metal halides
Zincblende crystal structure
Wurtzite structure type
Semiconductor materials